Stabat Mater by Alessandro Scarlatti is a religious musical work composed for two voices (soprano/alto), two violins and basso continuo, in 1724, on a commission from the Order of Friars Minor, the "Knights of the Virgin of Sorrows" of the Church of San Luigi in Naples for Lent

The text, the Stabat Mater sequence, is a 13th-century liturgical text meditating on the suffering of Mary, mother of Christ.

Considered outdated by those who had ordered it, Scarlatti's work was replaced in 1736 by the famous Stabat Mater by Giovanni Battista Pergolesi.

Scarlatti set the Stabat Mater three times. There is another manuscript of a three-part Stabat Mater, dated 1715 and kept in Naples (Stabat Mater [II]) and a third work, composed for four voices, dated 1723, but now lost (Stabat Mater [III]).

Description 

The Stabat Mater consists of eighteen pieces that can be grouped into four parts, starting and ending with a duet.

Scarlatti inverts verses 10 and 11 and groups verse 13 with verse 14, and verse 15 also plays verses 16 and 17 in a recitative. That is eighteen numbers for twenty verses.

Scarlatti's late composition impresses by its extraordinary musical richness, variety of forms, chromatic freedom and flexibility of expression. Thus the work is one of his most popular religious works today.

A performance takes about forty minutes.

 Stabat Mater dolorosa, a due – Adagio
 Cujus animam gementem, canto solo – Moderato e dolce
 O quam tristis, alto solo – Poco andante
 Quae moerebat et dolebat, a due – Adagio
 Quis est homo, canto solo – Andante
 Quis non posset contritari, alto solo – Andantino
 Pro peccatis suae gentis, canto solo – Moderato
 Vidit suum dulcem natum, a due – Moderato
 Pia Mater, canto solo – Andantino
 Sancta Mater, alto solo – Andante moderato
 Fac ut ardeat cor meum, canto solo – Andante molto
 Tui nati vulnerati, a due – Adagio
 Juxta crucem, alto solo – Andante smorzato
 Virgo virginum praeclara, canto solo – Allegro
 Fac ut portem Christi mortem, alto solo – Recitativo – Adagio e piano
 Inflammatus et accensus, canto solo – Andantino
 Fac me cruce custodiri, alto solo – Recitativo – Largo
 Quando corpus morietur, a due – Adagio e piano – Allegro

Manuscript 
 Florence, Conservatorio Luigi Cherubini, I-Fc (Ms.B 2353b).

Discography 
 Stabat Mater [I] – Mirella Freni, soprano; Teresa Berganza, mezzo-soprano; Paul Kuentz chamber orchestra, conductor Charles Mackerras (1976, Deutsche Grammophon) 
 Stabat Mater [I], Salve Regina [V] – Véronique Diestchy, soprano; Alain Zaepffel, countertenor; Ensemble Gradiva (7-9 August 1988, Adda 581048 / Accord) 
 Stabat Mater [I] – Gemma Bertagnolli, soprano; Sara Mingardo, contralto; Concerto Italiano, dir. Rinaldo Alessandrini (1998, Opus 111 30-160 / Naïve Records OP30441)  — with Pergolesi
 Stabat Mater [I], Salve Regina [III] – Sandrine Piau, soprano; Gérard Lesne, alto; Il Seminario musicale (1998, Virgin 5 45366 2) 
 Stabat Mater [I] – Emma Kirkby, soprano; Daniel Taylor, countertenor; Theatre Of Early Music (26-29 August 2004, Atma Classique)

References

Bibliography 
  enregistrement : OCLC:1007458967

External links 
 
 Alessandro Scarlatti, Stabat Mater on stabatmater.info

Compositions by Alessandro Scarlatti
Scarlatti
Christian music
1724 compositions